The Washington Relief Society Hall is a historic building in Washington, Utah. It was built as an adobe building in 1875 for the local chapter of the Relief Society of the Church of Jesus Christ of Latter-day Saints, and designed in the Greek Revival style. It was expanded with a west wing in 1904, and stuccoed. It has been listed on the National Register of Historic Places since August 27, 1980.

References

Adobe buildings and structures
National Register of Historic Places in Washington County, Utah
Greek Revival architecture in Utah
Buildings and structures completed in 1875
1875 establishments in Utah Territory
Relief Society buildings
19th-century Latter Day Saint church buildings